Gallium(III) selenide (Ga2Se3) is a chemical compound. It has a defect sphalerite (cubic form of ZnS) structure. It is a p-type semiconductor 

It can be formed by union of the elements. It hydrolyses slowly in water and quickly in mineral acids to form toxic hydrogen selenide gas. The reducing capabilities of the selenide ion make it vulnerable to oxidizing agents. It is advised therefore that it not come into contact with bases.

References

Selenides
Gallium compounds
Semiconductor materials